Shengnan Sun and Chunmei Ji were the defending champions, but chose not to participate that year.

Su-wei Hsieh and Shuai Peng won in the final 6–7(4–7), 7–6(7–3), [10–7], against Marta Domachowska and Nadia Petrova.

Seeds

Draw

Draw

External links
Draw

Doubles
Commonwealth Bank Tennis Classic